Chromadepth is a patented system from the company Chromatek (a subsidiary of American Paper Optics since 2002) that produces a stereoscopic effect based upon differences in the diffraction of color through a special prism-like holographic film fitted into glasses.  Chromadepth glasses purposely exacerbate chromatic aberration and give the illusion of colors taking up different positions in space, with red being in front, and blue being behind. This works particularly well with the sky, sea or grass as a background, and redder objects in the foreground.

Technical details 
With computer-controlled etching, the technology to create thin plastic sheets with thousands of microscopic ‘prism’ lenses that can magnify or diffract light can be made. Since violet light has more energy than red, and bends more when refracted, some lenses can distort an image if they don’t focus all of the colors at the same point. This distortion is called chromatic aberration.

One type of film etching creates lenses that deliberately exaggerate this aberration, separating the colors of an image into different convergence points in the visual field. It’s a patented process called ChromaDepth. Glasses with ChromaDepth diffraction lenses create an artificial visual depth. “Warm” colors, toward the infrared end of the spectrum, appear closer, and ‘cool” colors toward the violet end appear further away.

Any 2D media piece in colors can be given a 3D effect as long as the color spectrum is put into use with the foreground being in red, and the background in blue. From front to back the scheme follows the visible light spectrum, from red to orange, yellow, green and blue. This means any color is associated in a fixed fashion with a certain depth when viewing. As a result, ChromaDepth works best with artificially produced or enhanced pictures, since the color indicates the depth. (Natural images diminish the ChromaDepth effect because they reflect colors across the full spectrum, creating imaginary contours without explicit contrast. Artificially constructed or deliberately enhanced images exploit the forced color separation.)

Unlike anaglyph images or polarization, creating real-life ChromaDepth pictures without manual enhancement is practically impossible, since cameras cannot portray true depth; most other 3D schemes use the concept of stereopsis. However, this also gives ChromaDepth images a distinct advantage: unlike stereopsis-based schemes that require two images, ChromaDepth contains depth information in one image, which eliminates the ghosting seen in other schemes when one attempts to view them without 3D glasses. Thus, ChromaDepth images can be viewed comfortably and legibly without glasses, even though the 3D effect will not be perceivable without them.

History 
ChromaDepth 3-D was invented by US researcher Richard Steenblik after he noticed that the bright colors on the screen of a TEMPEST video game seemed to lie in different depth planes. In the course of eight years of after-hours experimentation, Steenblik created plastic prisms, glass double prisms, Fresnel prisms, and liquid optics using glycerin and Chinese cinnamon oil held in wedge-shaped glass cells. These liquid glasses worked, but were not suited for mass production. Steenblik and his business partner, Dr. Frederick Lauter, were about to give up when a new optical development came to their attention. Researchers at the Massachusetts Institute of Technology (MIT) had developed binary optics; a way of making very thin diffractive optics with the efficiency of refractive optics.

Optical devices use reflection, refraction, or diffraction to move light around. Optics which use refraction, such as lenses, are usually designed to reduce refraction. The binary optics found in ChromaDepth 3-D glasses, combine refraction and diffraction to make thin optics that act like thick glass prisms. After two years of development work with MIT, the ChromaDepth 3-D production solution was found.

ChromaDepth lenses were first used commercially in June 1992.

Usage in popular media 

In 1997, American cable TV network Nickelodeon distributed Chromadepth glasses at Blockbuster Video and through some Kraft products, which could be used for special 3D segments on new programming that September, terming the glasses "Nogglegoggles" and the 3D format "Nogglevision". The Rock band KISS utilized the Chromadepth process for an alternate version of the music video for their 1998 single Psycho Circus, releasing it on VHS at that time with a free pair of glasses for viewing. Chromadepth glasses were also utilized for the VH1 series I Love the '80s 3-D, with free pairs of glasses available at Best Buy locations.

The 1996 computer game Stay Tooned! featured three mini-games designed for Chromadepth (named "Toonvision" in the program & manual), with new copies of the game coming with a pair of Chromadepth glasses.

Chromadepth glasses have been used and distributed for some haunted house and Halloween attractions for added visual appeal, often featuring custom glasses for patrons. Numerous books, special publications, promotional giveaways, and children's toys have been released with or intended for use with Chromadepth glasses as well, notably including Crayola and Melissa & Doug's lines of 3D art and toy products, and Disney's line of 3D Toy Story 3 products, among many others.

The House of Eternal Return walk-in art installation in Santa Fe, New Mexico, USA has fluorescent murals and sculptures that are intended to have interesting effects when viewed through ChromaDepth glasses.

See also 

2D-plus-depth

References 

ChromaDepth Patent
Chromatek company web site 

Oregon State University
Chromostereoscopy for Use in Visualization

ChromaDepth images 
3D ChromaDepth Animated Music Scores

3D imaging